Kumanovski Vesnik (Macedonian Cyrillic: Кумановски весник) was a local weekly newspaper in Macedonia.

References

Newspapers published in North Macedonia
Macedonian-language newspapers
Socialist Republic of Macedonia
2001 establishments in the Republic of Macedonia
Mass media in Kumanovo